Crazy Awesome Teachers is a 2020 Indonesian comedy drama film directed by , written by Rahabi Mandra, produced by Dian Sastrowardoyo and Tanya Yuson and starring Gading Marten, Boris Bokir and Kevin Ardilova.

Cast 
 Gading Marten as Taat Pribadi
 Boris Bokir as Nelson Manulang
 Kevin Ardilova as Ipang
 Dwiky Al Asyam as Tukang jahit
 Ibnu Jamil as Gagah
 Shakira Jasmine as Saulina
 Faradina Mufti as Rahayu
 Nikandro Mailangkay as Bimbim
 Dian Sastrowardoyo as Nirmala
 Arswendi Nasution as Purnama
 Asri Welas as Indah
 Kiki Narendra

Release
Crazy Awesome Teachers was released on August 17, 2020 on Netflix.

References

External links
 
 

2020 films
Indonesian-language Netflix original films
2020s Indonesian-language films
Indonesian comedy-drama films
2020 direct-to-video films